Michał Kotkowski (born 8 December 1998) is a Polish Paralympic athlete who competes in sprinting events at international track and field competitions. He is a World bronze medalist and a double European champion, he has also competed at the 2020 Summer Paralympics where he reached fourth place in the 400m T37. He is coached by former Paralympic champion Andrzej Wróbel.

References

1998 births
Living people
Sportspeople from Poznań
Paralympic athletes of Poland
Polish male sprinters
Athletes (track and field) at the 2020 Summer Paralympics
Medalists at the World Para Athletics Championships
Medalists at the World Para Athletics European Championships
21st-century Polish people